The Miss Kentucky competition is the pageant that selects the representative for the state of Kentucky in the Miss America pageant. Kentucky has once won the Miss America crown.

Multiple Miss Kentucky titleholders have gone on to make themselves notable:
 Heather French Henry, Miss Kentucky 1999, is Kentucky's only Miss America winner to date.
 Mallory Ervin, Miss Kentucky 2010, is most well known for her appearance on the American television show, The Amazing Race. 
 Djuan Trent, Miss Kentucky 2011, was the first Miss America contestant to openly come out as queer.

Hannah Edelen from Springfield was crowned Miss Kentucky 2022 on June 18, 2022 at The Brown Theater in Louisville. She competed for the title of Miss America 2023 at the Mohegan Sun in Uncasville, Connecticut in December 2022 where she was Jean Bartel Social Impact Finalist and named Miss Congeniality.

Gallery of past titleholders

Results summary
The following is a visual summary of the past results of Miss Kentucky titleholders at the national Miss America pageants/competitions. The year in parentheses indicates the year of the national competition during which a placement and/or award was garnered, not the year attached to the contestant's state title.

Placements
 Miss Americas: Heather French (2000)
 2nd runners-up: Jean Megerle (1935)
 3rd runners-up: Darlene Compton (1975)
 4th runners-up: Dorothy Slatten (1940), Chera-Lyn Cook (1999), Whitney Boyles (2001), Mallory Ervin (2010)
 Top 10: Linda Sawyer (1965), Marcia Malone Bell (1978), Gwendolyn Witten (1983), Lynn Thompson (1984), Kelly Lin Brumagen (1985), Laurie Janine Keller (1986), Tawnya Mullins (1993), Veronica Duka (1997), Djuan Trent (2011)
 Top 12: Emily Cox (2009), Ramsey Carpenter (2015), Laura Jones (2017)
 Top 15: Mary Madeline O'Laughlin (1925), Jean Megerle* (1936), Charlet Hiteman (1936), Dorothy Slatten (1941), Evelyn L. Murray (1947), Jessica Casebolt (2013), Jenna Day (2014)
 Top 16: Patricia Alden Fenton** (1946)
 Top 18: Lucille Rader (1933)

Awards

Preliminary awards
 Preliminary Lifestyle and Fitness: Dorothy Slatten (1940), Evelyn L. Murray (1947), Tawnya Mullins (1993), Heather French (2000), Whitney Boyles (2001)
 Preliminary Talent: Darlene Compton (1975), Gwendolyn Witten (1983), Chera-Lyn Cook (1999), Ramsey Carpenter (2015)

Non-finalist awards
 Non-finalist Talent: Jane Brock (1958), Marsha Griffith (1976), Victoria Harned (1977), Melinda Cumberledge (1987), Tonya Virgin (1994), MacKenzie Mayes (2004)
 Non-finalist Interview: Maria Maldonado (2005)

Other awards
 Miss Congeniality: Hannah Edelen (2023)
 America's Choice: Laura Katherine Jones (2017)
 Dr. David. B. Allman Medical Scholarship: Kelly Lin Brumagen (1985), Mary Catherine Correll (2003)
 Jean Bartel Social Impact Finalists: Hannah Edelen (2023)
 Konica Visual Arts Scholarship: Kristie Hicks (1996)
 Louanne Gamba Instrumental Award: Ramsey Carpenter (2015)
 Quality of Life Award Winners: Emily Cox (2009), Ann Blair Thornton (2012)
 Quality of Life Award 1st runners-up: Heather French (2000), MacKenzie Mayes (2004)
 Quality of Life Award Finalists: Whitney Boyles (2001), Mary Catherine Correll (2003), Mallory Ervin (2010)
 STEM Scholarship Award Winners: Molly Matney (2018)
 Women in Business Scholarship Award Winners: Alex Francke (2020)

Winners

Notes

References

External links
 

Kentucky
Beauty pageants in Kentucky
Women in Kentucky
Recurring events established in 1922
1922 establishments in Kentucky
Annual events in Kentucky